"Keep the Faith" is a song by American rock band Bon Jovi. It was written by Jon Bon Jovi, Richie Sambora, and Desmond Child. It was released on October 12, 1992, as the lead single from Bon Jovi's fifth album of the same name. It is characterized by its driving bass line and is a live staple for the band. "I Wish Everyday Could Be Like Christmas" appeared as a B-side to the song in the United States. In the US, the song reached number one on the Billboard Album Rock Tracks chart and peaked at number 29 on the Billboard Hot 100. Worldwide, "Keep the Faith" topped the charts of Norway and Portugal and reached number five in the United Kingdom.

It is a regular song at live shows by the band and is featured on the Live from London and The Crush Tour DVDs. When played live it features Jon Bon Jovi playing percussion. In 2009, Jon Bon Jovi released a new version of "Keep the Faith" with the Washington DC Youth Choir on the compilation album Oh Happy Day. German Eurodance band X-Perience has also covered "Keep the Faith" in their 1997 album Take Me Home.

Music video
The music video for the song was directed by Phil Joanou and shot both in black and white and color. It combines scenes with whole band playing live on the stage and band members in New York City. Scenes in New York are mainly featuring Jon Bon Jovi and Richie Sambora appearing in various parts of the city, but the whole band we can see only in the beginning and the end of the video. We can see Jon sitting on the stairway of a house, walking down the Brooklyn Bridge being followed by group of teenagers, and driving in the bus. Sambora is also seen playing the guitar on the Brooklyn Bridge and on Wall Street. One important scene features both Bon Jovi and Sambora on a stairway.

Releases

Charts

Weekly charts

Year-end charts

References

1992 singles
1992 songs
Bon Jovi songs
Mercury Records singles
Music videos directed by Phil Joanou
Number-one singles in Norway
Number-one singles in Portugal
Song recordings produced by Bob Rock
Songs written by Desmond Child
Songs written by Jon Bon Jovi
Songs written by Richie Sambora